The Knoxville Challenger is a professional tennis tournament played on indoor hard courts. It is currently part of the ATP Challenger Tour. It is held annually in Knoxville, Tennessee, United States, since 2000.

The Knoxville Challenger is held at Goodfriend Tennis Center on the campus of the University of Tennessee. The tournament is the second of three indoor Challenger tournaments at college venues to end the USTA Pro Circuit season. The Charlottesville Men's Pro Challenger (University of Virginia) is held the week before, and the Champaign Challenger (University of Illinois) is the week after.

Past finals

Singles

Doubles

References

External links
Official website

 
ATP Challenger Tour
Challenger tennis tournaments
Hard court tennis tournaments in the United States
Tennis in Tennessee
Recurring sporting events established in 2000